Wawa is a Mambiloid language spoken in a region of Cameroon and just inside bordering Nigeria used by about 3,000 people in three main dialects.

All speakers are bilingual, often in Fulfulde.

References

Mambiloid languages
Languages of Cameroon
Languages of Nigeria